Jean Vuarnet (18 January 1933 – 1 January 2017) was an alpine ski racer from France. An Olympic gold medalist, he was born in Le Bardo, Tunisia.

Career 

The high point of Vuarnet's racing career came at age 27 at the 1960 Winter Olympics in Squaw Valley, where he won the gold medal in the downhill. Previously, he had won bronze in the same event at the World Championships in 1958 at Bad Gastein. 
From 1957 to 1959, Vuarnet achieved seven titles as a French skiing champion: twice in the downhill (1958, 1959), slalom (1957, 1958) and alpine combined, and in the giant slalom (1957). He had placed third in the slalom and the alpine combined in the "Kandahar" at Sestriere in 1956. He was not selected for the Olympic team in 1956.

He was a skiing innovator. He honed his revolutionary aerodynamic "egg position" (French: "dite de l'œuf") now known as The Tuck - a lower stance in which he squatted down with knees bent, arms outstretched and fists clasped together, in a bid to increase his speed. He also was the first to race on metal skis (skis métalliques Rossignol), on which he won the downhill at the 1960 Winter Olympics. The tenth racer on the course, he won by a full half-second.
 
After retiring from active competition, Vuarnet became head of the Italian alpine ski team from 1968 to 1972, and vice-president of the French skiing association, a role in which he served from 1972 to 1974.

Business 
In the early 1960s, Vuarnet was asked by his hometown of Morzine to help develop the skiing area around the town. He did so by creating the purpose-build resort of Avoriaz, together with a group of young architects. Around Avoriaz he developed a new area for alpine skiing, later linked to other areas in France and Switzerland known as The Portes du Soleil.

Vuarnet also gave his name to the exclusive Vuarnet sunglasses in 1961, now owned by a U.K. private equity group, Neo Investment Partners.

Personal 
In 1958, he married Edith Bonlieu, a three-time French women's ski champion and sister of François Bonlieu.

His wife Edith and youngest son Patrick were among the members of the Order of the Solar Temple cult who committed suicide in 1995. He married his second wife Christiane in 1999; she died of a heart attack in 2012.

After a stroke, Vuarnet died at age 83 in 2017 at Sallanches, Haute-Savoie.

References

External links
 
 International Skiing History Association – Jean Vuarnet
 Vuarnet.com – Jean Vuarnet
 You Tube – Jean Vuarnet: Tuck position (1961) – 

1933 births
2017 deaths
French male alpine skiers
Alpine skiers at the 1960 Winter Olympics
Olympic alpine skiers of France
Olympic gold medalists for France
Olympic medalists in alpine skiing
Medalists at the 1960 Winter Olympics